Joseph Williams (4 November 1907 – 18 January 1987) was an Irish footballer.

A fullback, he joined Shamrock Rovers in 1934 from Bray Unknowns F.C. where he had played since 1929. During his time at Glenmalure Park he made the centre-half position his own.

Williams won one international cap for the Republic of Ireland national football team against Norway in a World Cup qualifier at the Ullevaal Stadion on 10 of October 1937.

Williams had a benefit game at Dalymount Park on 10 April 1940..

In March 1957, Williams was flown to the US to take part in a This Is Your Life special for Maureen O'Hara, as Williams was her favourite Rovers player. He presented her with an autographed soccer ball from the team.

International

Honours
League of Ireland: 2
  Shamrock Rovers F.C. - 1937/38, 1938/1939
FAI Cup: 1
  Shamrock Rovers - 1936
League of Ireland Shield: 2
  Shamrock Rovers - 1934/35, 1937/38
Leinster Senior Cup: 1
  Shamrock Rovers - 1938

References

Sources
 The Hoops by Paul Doolan and Robert Goggins

1907 births
1987 deaths
Republic of Ireland association footballers
Irish Free State association footballers
Bray Unknowns F.C. players
Shamrock Rovers F.C. players
League of Ireland players
Irish Free State international footballers
Association football defenders